Institute of the Estonian Language  is the official language-regulatory authority of the Estonian language. It is located in the capital city of Estonia, Tallinn. Its stated formal goal is to contribute to the long-term survival of the Estonian language. The Institute researches modern Estonian, the history of the Estonian language, Estonian dialects and Finno-Ugric cognate languages. 

It was founded in 1993 as the Institute of Language and Literature was reorganized. The institute's director, since 2020, is Arvi Tavast.

Directors
 Asta Õim
 Urmas Sutrop
 Tõnu Tender
 Arvi Tavast

References

External links
 

Language regulators
Estonian language